Alikersantti (Undersergeant in Swedish) is the lowest Finnish non-commissioned officer military rank. Alikersantti is one rank above a Korpraali (Lance-Corporal) and one below a Kersantti (Sergeant). A holder of this rank is typically a squad leader, assistant squad leader, gun section leader or a fighting vehicle commander.

Obtaining the rank 
Conscripts are first given basic military training for 2 months. About 30% are selected for NCO training (aliupseerikoulu or AUK), which lasts 4 months. Most alikersanttis are posted to companies for squad leader duty. This is the most common conscript leader rank. Additionally, in many specialist branches with a 12-month service the rank is given automatically and the alikersantti is not given a command, e.g. assistant mechanic (apumekaanikko) in the Air Force.

It is also the highest rank that can be given to a soldier that has not completed any NCO course.

History and related ranks

See also 
 Finnish military ranks

References

Military ranks of Finland
Military insignia

fi:Alikersantti